Dr. Mustafa Lutfi was the Minister of Education of the Maldives from 2008 to 2010. He also served as the Chancellor of Maldives National University from 2008 to 2012. He is currently the Advisor to the President at rank of a Minister.

References

External links

Government ministers of the Maldives
Living people
Year of birth missing (living people)
Place of birth missing (living people)